The Mobilize Duo is a two-seater electric quadricycle set to replace the Renault Twizy in 2023, which was unveiled at the 2022 Paris Motor Show. First previewed by the Mobilize EZ-1 concept in 2021, it was eventually renamed to its current name and shown at the 2021 Viva Tech event.

Overview
The Duo will not be available for purchase, but be offered to individuals on a subscription basis.

Bento
A cargo version, named the Mobilize Bento, which will be available with a  load area, was announced alongside the Duo.

References

Electric cars
Production electric cars
Duo